Aet Maatee (born 10 November 1961) is an Estonian cultural organizer, long-term director of the Estonian Song and Dance Festival Foundation, director of the Pärnu Museum, and politician. She was a member of XIII Riigikogu.

She has been a member of Social Democratic Party.

References

Living people
1961 births
Social Democratic Party (Estonia) politicians
Members of the Riigikogu, 2015–2019
Women members of the Riigikogu
Estonian curators
Recipients of the Order of the White Star, 3rd Class
Politicians from Tartu
Tallinn University alumni
21st-century Estonian women politicians